Prostate stem cell antigen is a protein that in humans is encoded by the PSCA gene.

This gene encodes a glycosylphosphatidylinositol-anchored cell membrane glycoprotein. In addition to being highly expressed in the prostate it is also expressed in the bladder, placenta, colon, kidney, and stomach. This gene has a nonsynonymous nucleotide polymorphism at its start codon.

Clinical significance 

This gene is up-regulated in a large proportion of prostate cancers and is also detected in cancers of the bladder and pancreas.

Mechanism 
A study reviewing the potential role of PSCA proposed that expression of the gene is regulated through the androgen receptor complex. The proteins translated from the gene, is then glycosylated in the ER, and transported to the cell membrane where it is connected to a lipid. This results in the formation of a GPI-anchored proteins, these proteins can be often secreted by cells or play a role in cell signaling. While, the ligand activating PSCA or the downstream physiological role has not yet been determined, because of its mechanism and over expression in prostate cancer cells, PSCA can potentially serve as a biomarker for detecting cancer.

References

Further reading